Juan Eduardo David Posada (born 25 April 1911, Las Villas, Cuba — died 8 August 1981, Havana) was a Cuban artist.  He is known best for his drawings, illustrations, caricatures, and paintings.

Personal life 
David spent his early years in Spain with his mother and returned to Cuba in 1919.  As a young adult, he worked in Cienfuegos, Cuba, and began studying art under Adolfo Meano.  He had his first solo exhibition in 1931, displaying thirty caricatures at a photography shop in Santa Clara.  The exhibition earned him comparisons to the Salvadoran caricaturist, Toño Salazar.

David had two siblings, Eduardo "Lolo" David and Maria "Lila" David. 
 
At the same time, he formed Ariel, a political group that opposed the regime of President Gerardo Machado, with Carlos Rafael Rodríguez, Raúl Aparicio, and Rafael Viego.  His political activities led to several arrests, and eventually to his departure from Santa Clara to Havana, in 1935.  While in Havana, he continued to exhibit his work and worked with many magazines, including Isla, Resumen, Mediodía, Social, Patria, Grafos, and Bohemia.

Individual Exhibitions
 1931: Fotografía Santiago, Cienfuegos, Cuba
 1937: David, Havana
 1949: Lake Success, New York City
 1962: David: Dibujos y Caricaturas, Havana
 1978: 40 Caricaturas y algunas intromisiones. David, Havana
 1981: Exposición Homenaje. 70 Aniversario. Juan David, Havana
 2002: Juan David: La realidad trascendida, Museo Nacional de Bellas Artes, Havana

Collective Exhibitions
 1939:  XI Salón de Humoristas, Círculo de Bellas Artes, Havana
 1948: Arte Cubano Contemporáneo," Tegucigalpa, Honduras
 1968: Pittura Cubana Oggi, Istituto Italo Latinoamericano, Rome, Italy
 1970: Salón 70, Museo Nacional de Bellas Artes, Havana
 1994: Nuevas Adquisiciones, Museo Nacional de Bellas Artes, Havana

Awards
 1939: XI Salón de Humoristas, Círculo de Bellas Artes, Havana
 1950: First Prize Personal Caricature XVI Salón de Humoristas, Havana
 1950: Second Prize Dibujo Humorístico, XVI Salón de Humoristas, Havana
 1955: First Cartoon Prize, XXI Salón de Humoristas, Museo Nacional de Bellas Artes, Havana

Collections
His works can be found in Museo del Humor, San Antonio de los Baños, Havana, and in the Museo Nacional de Bellas Artes, Havana.

References

  Jose Veigas-Zamora, Cristina Vives Gutierrez, Adolfo V. Nodal, Valia Garzon, Dannys Montes de Oca. Memoria: Cuban Art of the 20th Century. California/International Arts Foundation 2001. 
 Jose Viegas. 'Memoria: Artes Visuales Cubanas Del Siglo Xx. California International Arts 2004.

External links
 Drawing of Enrique Labrador Ruiz by Juan David, digitized by the Cuban Heritage Collection, University of Miami Libraries. Labrador Ruiz was a journalist, novelist, essayist, short story writer, and poet exiled from Cuba in 1976.

1911 births
1981 deaths
People from Villa Clara Province
Cuban contemporary artists
Cuban expatriates in Spain